The 2016 ABN AMRO World Tennis Tournament (or Rotterdam Open) was a men's tennis tournament played on indoor hard courts. It took place at the Rotterdam Ahoy arena in the Dutch city of Rotterdam, between 8–14 February 2016. It was the 43rd edition of the Rotterdam Open, whose official name is the ABN AMRO World Tennis Tournament. The competition was part of the ATP World Tour 500 series of the 2016 ATP World Tour.

Points and prize money

Point distribution

Prize money 

1 Qualifiers prize money is also the Round of 32 prize money
* per team

Singles main-draw entrants

Seeds 

1 Rankings as of February 1, 2016.

Other entrants 
The following players received wildcards into the main draw:
 Thiemo de Bakker
 Robin Haase
 Alexander Zverev

The following players received entry from the qualifying draw:
 Ivan Dodig
 Ernests Gulbis
 Andrey Kuznetsov
 Nicolas Mahut

The following player received entry as a lucky loser:
 Evgeny Donskoy

Withdrawals 
Before the tournament
  Roger Federer (knee injury) →replaced by  Chung Hyeon
  Richard Gasquet (flu) →replaced by  Evgeny Donskoy
  Nick Kyrgios (arm injury) →replaced by  Lukáš Rosol

Doubles main-draw entrants

Seeds 

1 Rankings are as of February 1, 2016.

Other entrants 
The following pairs received wildcards into the main draw:
 Thiemo de Bakker /  Robin Haase
 Jesse Huta Galung /  Bart van den Berg

The following pair received entry from the qualifying draw:
 Marin Draganja /  Lukáš Rosol

Finals

Singles 

  Martin Kližan defeated  Gaël Monfils 6–7(1–7), 6–3, 6–1

Doubles 

  Nicolas Mahut /  Vasek Pospisil defeated  Philipp Petzschner /  Alexander Peya 7–6(7–2), 6–4

References

External links 
 

 
ABN AMRO World Tennis Tournament
ABN AMRO World Tennis Tournament
ABN AMRO World Tennis Tournament